Gora Camara (born April 12, 2001) is a Senegalese professional basketball player for Virtus Bologna of the Italian Lega Basket Serie A (LBA) and the EuroLeague. Due to his Italian upbringing, he is considered a "homegrown player" in the domestic championship.

Professional career

Virtus Bologna (2018–present)
After having played in the youth teams of Virtus Bologna for several years, Camara was added to the first team in the 2018–19 season, during which he won the Basketball Champions League.

Loans to Casale and Pesaro (2019–2022)
In the 2019–20 season, Camara was loaned to Junior Casale Monferrato, a team of Italy's second league, Serie A2. Camara played in Monferrato also in the following season, until 2021. In the 2021–22 season, he was loaned to Pesaro of the LBA; along with Pesaro, he reached the national playoffs. However, Pesaro was ousted 3–0 by Virtus in the first round.

Return to Virtus (2022–present)
On 3 August 2022, Camara returned to Virtus Bologna, where he played in the LBA and the EuroLeague. On 29 September 2022, after having ousted Olimpia Milano in the semifinals, Virtus won its third Supercup, defeating 72–69 Banco di Sardegna Sassari and achieving a back-to-back, following the 2021 trophy.

References

2001 births
Living people
Italian men's basketball players
Lega Basket Serie A players
Senegalese men's basketball players
Centers (basketball)
Virtus Bologna players